Federation of Malaya competed for the first time in the 1954 Asian Games held in Manila, Philippines from 1 May 1954 to 9 May 1954.

References

Nations at the 1954 Asian Games
1954
Asian Games